Thomas Edmund Scroggy (March 18, 1843 – March 6, 1915) was Civil War veteran who served one term as a U.S. Representative from Ohio from 1905 to 1907.

Early life and career 
Born in Harveysburg, Ohio, Scroggy attended the public schools.
He engaged in manufacturing.

Civil War 
Enlisted in July 1861 as a private in Company H, Thirty-ninth Regiment, Ohio Volunteer Infantry, and served in that capacity and a corporal.
Honorably discharged and mustered out at Camp Dennison in March 1865.

Legal career
In June 1865 Scroggy engaged in the retail business in Xenia, Ohio.
He was elected Justice of the Peace in 1869 and served one term.
He studied law.
He was admitted to the bar September 8, 1871, and commenced practice in Xenia, Ohio.

He served three terms as clerk and three terms as solicitor of the city of Xenia.
Common Pleas Judge in 1898, and again elected for a term of five years beginning February 1904 from which he resigned upon his election to Congress.

Congress 
Scroggy was elected as a Republican to the Fifty-ninth Congress (March 4, 1905 – March 3, 1907).
He was not a candidate for renomination in 1906.

Later career and death 
He resumed the practice of his profession.
He moved to Tulsa, Oklahoma, in 1912, where he died March 6, 1915.
He was interred in Woodlawn Cemetery, Xenia, Ohio.

References

 Retrieved on November 3, 2008

External links

1843 births
1915 deaths
Politicians from Xenia, Ohio
People from Harveysburg, Ohio
Union Army soldiers
People of Ohio in the American Civil War
Ohio lawyers
19th-century American politicians
19th-century American lawyers
Republican Party members of the United States House of Representatives from Ohio